The 1878 Newcastle-under-Lyme by-election was fought on 23 August 1878.  The byelection was fought due to the resignation of the incumbent Conservative MP, Sir Edmund Buckley.  It was won by the Liberal candidate Samuel Rathbone Edge.

References

1878 in England
1878 elections in the United Kingdom
By-elections to the Parliament of the United Kingdom in Staffordshire constituencies
19th century in Staffordshire